= 108 Names of Ganesh =

List of names of the God Ganesh in Hindu mythology

In Hindu Scriptures, the God Ganesh has 108 names. The following is a list of the names.

== List of names ==
Sanskrit Name	Name Mantra	Name Meaning	Name	Name Mantra
गजानन	ॐ गजाननाय नमः।	Elephant-faced Lord	Gajanana	Om Gajananaya Namah
गणाध्यक्ष	ॐ गणाध्यक्षाय नमः।	Lord of All Ganas (Gods)	Ganadhyaksha	Om Ganadhyakshaya Namah।
विघ्नराज	ॐ विघ्नराजाय नमः।	Lord of All Hindrances	Vighnaraja	Om Vighnarajaya Namah।
विनायक	ॐ विनायकाय नमः।	Lord of All	Vinayaka	Om Vinayakaya Namah।
द्वैमातुर	ॐ द्वैमातुराय नमः।	One who has two Mothers	Dvaimatura	Om Dvaimaturaya Namah।
द्विमुख	ॐ द्विमुखाय नमः।	Lord with two Heads	Dwimukha	Om Dwimukhaya Namah।
प्रमुख	ॐ प्रमुखाय नमः।	Supreme Head of the Universe	Pramukha	Om Pramukhaya Namah।
सुमुख	ॐ सुमुखाय नमः।	Auspicious Face	Sumukha	Om Sumukhaya Namah।
कृति	ॐ कृतिने नमः।	Lord of Music	Kriti	Om Kritine Namah।
सुप्रदीप	ॐ सुप्रदीपाय नमः।	Best Illuminator	Supradipa	Om Supradipaya Namah।
सुखनिधी	ॐ सुखनिधये नमः।	The God who gives happiness and money	Sukhanidhi	Om Sukhanidhaye Namah।
सुराध्यक्ष	ॐ सुराध्यक्षाय नमः।	Sovereign of the Gods	Suradhyaksha	Om Suradhyakshaya Namah।
सुरारिघ्न	ॐ सुरारिघ्नाय नमः।	The Destroyer of the Enemies of Devas	Surarighna	Om Surarighnaya Namah।
महागणपति	ॐ महागणपतये नमः।	Omnipotent and Supreme Lord	Mahaganapati	Om Mahaganapataye Namah।
मान्या	ॐ मान्याय नमः।		Manya	Om Manyaya Namah।
महाकाल	ॐ महाकालाय नमः।	The big Kal	Mahakala	Om Mahakalaya Namah।
महाबला	ॐ महाबलाय नमः।	Enormously Strong Lord	Mahabala	Om Mahabalaya Namah।
हेरम्ब	ॐ हेरम्बाय नमः।	Mother's Beloved Son	Heramba	Om Herambaya Namah।
लम्बजठर	ॐ लम्बजठरायै नमः।	Big Bellied	Lambajathara	Om Lambajatharayai Namah।
ह्रस्वग्रीव	ॐ ह्रस्व ग्रीवाय नमः।		Haswagriva	Om Haswa Grivaya Namah।
महोदरा	ॐ महोदराय नमः।	Having Large Abdomen	Mahodara	Om Mahodaraya Namah।
मदोत्कट	ॐ मदोत्कटाय नमः।		Madotkata	Om Madotkataya Namah।
महावीर	ॐ महावीराय नमः।		Mahavira	Om Mahaviraya Namah।
मन्त्रिणे	ॐ मन्त्रिणे नमः।		Mantrine	Om Mantrine Namah।
मङ्गल स्वरा	ॐ मङ्गल स्वराय नमः।	Nice Swar	Mangala Swara	Om Mangala Swaraya Namah।
प्रमधा	ॐ प्रमधाय नमः।		Pramadha	Om Pramadhaya Namah।
प्रथम	ॐ प्रथमाय नमः।	First Among All	Prathama	Om Prathamaya Namah।
प्रज्ञा	ॐ प्राज्ञाय नमः।	Knowledge	Prajna	Om Prajnaya Namah।
विघ्नकर्ता	ॐ विघ्नकर्त्रे नमः।	Creator of Obstacles	Vighnakarta	Om Vighnakartre Namah।
विघ्नहर्ता	ॐ विघ्नहर्त्रे नमः।	Demolisher of Obstacles	Vignaharta	Om Vignahartre Namah।
विश्वनेत्र	ॐ विश्वनेत्रे नमः।	Eye of the Universe	Vishwanetra	Om Vishwanetre Namah।
विराट्पति	ॐ विराट्पतये नमः।	A big God	Viratpati	Om Viratpataye Namah।
श्रीपति	ॐ श्रीपतये नमः।	The Lord of Fortune	Shripati	Om Shripataye Namah।
वाक्पति	ॐ वाक्पतये नमः।	The Lord of Speech	Vakpati	Om Vakpataye Namah।
शृङ्गारिण	ॐ शृङ्गारिणे नमः।		Shringarin	Om Shringarine Namah।
अश्रितवत्सल	ॐ अश्रितवत्सलाय नमः।	The one whose love towards his subordinates is unquenchable.	Ashritavatsala	Om Ashritavatsalaya Namah।
शिवप्रिय	ॐ शिवप्रियाय नमः।	The favorite of Lord Shiv	Shivapriya	Om Shivapriyaya Namah।
शीघ्रकारिण	ॐ शीघ्रकारिणे नमः।		Shighrakarina	Om Shighrakarine Namah।
शाश्वत	ॐ शाश्वताय नमः।	Adoration to the Unchanging One	Shashwata	Om Shashwataya Namah।
बल	ॐ बल नमः।		Bala	Om Bala Namah।
बलोत्थिताय	ॐ बलोत्थिताय नमः।		Balotthitaya	Om Balotthitaya Namah।
भवात्मजाय	ॐ भवात्मजाय नमः।		Bhavatmajaya	Om Bhavatmajaya Namah।
पुराण पुरुष	ॐ पुराण पुरुषाय नमः।	The Omnipotent Personality	Purana Purusha	Om Purana Purushaya Namah।
पूष्णे	ॐ पूष्णे नमः।		Pushne	Om Pushne Namah।
पुष्करोत्षिप्त वारिणे	ॐ पुष्करोत्षिप्त वारिणे नमः।		Pushkarotshipta Varine	Om Pushkarotshipta Varine Namah।
अग्रगण्याय	ॐ अग्रगण्याय नमः।	The God ahead of all	Agraganyaya	Om Agraganyaya Namah।
अग्रपूज्याय	ॐ अग्रपूज्याय नमः।		Agrapujyaya	Om Agrapujyaya Namah।
अग्रगामिने	ॐ अग्रगामिने नमः।		Agragamine	Om Agragamine Namah।
मन्त्रकृते	ॐ मन्त्रकृते नमः।		Mantrakrite	Om Mantrakrite Namah।
चामीकरप्रभाय	ॐ चामीकरप्रभाय नमः।		Chamikaraprabhaya	Om Chamikaraprabhaya Namah।
सर्वाय	ॐ सर्वाय नमः।	Everybodys God	Sarvaya	Om Sarvaya Namah।
सर्वोपास्याय	ॐ सर्वोपास्याय नमः।		Sarvopasyaya	Om Sarvopasyaya Namah।
सर्व कर्त्रे	ॐ सर्व कर्त्रे नमः।		Sarvakartre	Om Sarva Kartre Namah।
सर्वनेत्रे	ॐ सर्वनेत्रे नमः।	Eyes of All	Sarvanetre	Om Sarvanetre Namah।
सर्वसिद्धिप्रदाय	ॐ सर्वसिद्धिप्रदाय नमः।		Sarvasiddhipradaya	Om Sarvasiddhipradaya Namah।
सिद्धये	ॐ सिद्धये नमः।		Siddhaye	Om Siddhaye Namah।
पञ्चहस्ताय	ॐ पञ्चहस्ताय नमः।		Panchahastaya	Om Panchahastaya Namah।
पार्वतीनन्दनाय	ॐ पार्वतीनन्दनाय नमः।	Son of Parvati	Parvatinadanaya	Om Parvatinandanaya Namah।
प्रभवे	ॐ प्रभवे नमः।		Prabhave	Om Prabhave Namah।
कुमारगुरवे	ॐ कुमारगुरवे नमः।		Kumaragurave	Om Kumaragurave Namah।
अक्षोभ्याय	ॐ अक्षोभ्याय नमः।		Akshobhyaya	Om Akshobhyaya Namah।
कुञ्जरासुर भञ्जनाय	ॐ कुञ्जरासुर भञ्जनाय नमः।		Kunjarasura Bhanjanaya	Om Kunjarasura Bhanjanaya Namah।
प्रमोदाय	ॐ प्रमोदाय नमः।	Happiness	Pramodaya	Om Pramodaya Namah।
मोदकप्रियाय	ॐ मोदकप्रियाय नमः।	The God who loves Modak	Modakapriyaya	Om Modakapriyaya Namah।
कान्तिमते	ॐ कान्तिमते नमः।		Kantimate	Om Kantimate Namah।
धृतिमते	ॐ धृतिमते नमः।		Dhritimate	Om Dhritimate Namah।
कामिने	ॐ कामिने नमः।		Kamine	Om Kamine Namah।
कपित्थपनसप्रियाय	ॐ कपित्थपनसप्रियाय नमः।		Kapitthapanasapriyaya	Om Kapitthapanasapriyaya Namah।
ब्रह्मचारिणे	ॐ ब्रह्मचारिणे नमः।		Brahmacharine	Om Brahmacharine Namah।
ब्रह्मरूपिणे	ॐ ब्रह्मरूपिणे नमः।		Brahmarupine	Om Brahmarupine Namah।
ब्रह्मविद्यादि दानभुवे	ॐ ब्रह्मविद्यादि दानभुवे नमः।		Brahmavidyadi Danabhuve	Om Brahmavidyadi Danabhuve Namah।
जिष्णवे	ॐ जिष्णवे नमः।		Jishnave	Om Jishnave Namah।
विष्णुप्रियाय	ॐ विष्णुप्रियाय नमः।		Vishnupriyaya	Om Vishnupriyaya Namah।
भक्त जीविताय	ॐ भक्त जीविताय नमः।		Bhakta Jivitaya	Om Bhakta Jivitaya Namah।
जितमन्मधाय	ॐ जितमन्मधाय नमः।		Jitamanmadhaya	Om Jitamanmadhaya Namah।
ऐश्वर्यकारणाय	ॐ ऐश्वर्यकारणाय नमः।		Aishwaryakaranaya	Om Aishwaryakaranaya Namah।
ज्यायसे	ॐ ज्यायसे नमः।		Jyayase	Om Jyayase Namah।
यक्षकिन्नेर सेविताय	ॐ यक्षकिन्नेर सेविताय नमः।		Yaksha Kinnerasevitaya	Om Yaksha Kinnerasevitaya Namah।
गङ्गा सुताय	ॐ गङ्गा सुताय नमः।		Ganga Sutaya	Om Ganga Sutaya Namah।
गणाधीशाय	ॐ गणाधीशाय नमः।		Ganadhishaya	Om Ganadhishaya Namah।
गम्भीर निनदाय	ॐ गम्भीर निनदाय नमः।		Gambhira Ninadaya	Om Gambhira Ninadaya Namah।
वटवे	ॐ वटवे नमः।		Vatave	Om Vatave Namah।
अभीष्टवरदाय	ॐ अभीष्टवरदाय नमः।		Abhishtavaradaya	Om Abhishtavaradaya Namah।
ज्योतिषे	ॐ ज्योतिषे नमः।		Jyotishe	Om Jyotishe Namah।
भक्तनिधये	ॐ भक्तनिधये नमः।		Bhktanidhaye	Om Bhktanidhaye Namah।
भावगम्याय	ॐ भावगम्याय नमः।		Bhavagamyaya	Om Bhavagamyaya Namah।
मङ्गलप्रदाय	ॐ मङ्गलप्रदाय नमः।		Mangalapradaya	Om Mangalapradaya Namah।
अव्यक्ताय	ॐ अव्यक्ताय नमः।		Avyaktaya	Om Avyaktaya Namah।
अप्राकृत पराक्रमाय	ॐ अप्राकृत पराक्रमाय नमः।		Aprakrita Parakramaya	Om Aprakrita Parakramaya Namah।
सत्यधर्मिणे	ॐ सत्यधर्मिणे नमः।		Satyadharmine	Om Satyadharmine Namah।
सखये	ॐ सखये नमः।		Sakhaye	Om Sakhaye Namah।
सरसाम्बुनिधये	ॐ सरसाम्बुनिधये नमः।		Sarasambunidhaye	Om Sarasambunidhaye Namah।
महेशाय	ॐ महेशाय नमः।		Maheshaya	Om Maheshaya Namah।
दिव्याङ्गाय	ॐ दिव्याङ्गाय नमः।		Divyangaya	Om Divyangaya Namah।
मणिकिङ्किणी मेखालाय	ॐ मणिकिङ्किणी मेखालाय नमः।		Manikinkini Mekhalaya	Om Manikinkini Mekhalaya Namah।
समस्त देवता मूर्तये	ॐ समस्त देवता मूर्तये नमः।		Samasta Devata Murtaye	Om Samasta Devata Murtaye Namah।
सहिष्णवे	ॐ सहिष्णवे नमः।		Sahishnave	Om Sahishnave Namah।
सततोत्थिताय	ॐ सततोत्थिताय नमः।		Satatotthitaya	Om Satatotthitaya Namah।
विघातकारिणे	ॐ विघातकारिणे नमः।		Vighatakarine	Om Vighatakarine Namah।
विश्वग्दृशे	ॐ विश्वग्दृशे नमः।		Vishwagdrishe	Om Vishwagdrishe Namah।
विश्वरक्षाकृते	ॐ विश्वरक्षाकृते नमः।		Vishwarakshakrite	Om Vishwarakshakrite Namah।
कल्याणगुरवे	ॐ कल्याणगुरवे नमः।		Kalyanagurave	Om Kalyanagurave Namah।
उन्मत्तवेषाय	ॐ उन्मत्तवेषाय नमः।		Unmattaveshaya	Om Unmattaveshaya Namah।
अपराजिते	ॐ अपराजिते नमः।		Aparajite	Om Aparajite Namah।
समस्त जगदाधाराय	ॐ समस्त जगदाधाराय नमः।		Samsta Jagadadharaya	Om Samsta Jagadadharaya Namah।
सर्वैश्वर्यप्रदाय	ॐ सर्वैश्वर्यप्रदाय नमः।		Sarwaishwaryapradaya	Om Sarwaishwaryapradaya Namah।
आक्रान्त चिद चित्प्रभवे	ॐ आक्रान्त चिद चित्प्रभवे नमः।		Akranta Chida Chitprabhave	Om Akranta Chida Chitprabhave Namah।
श्री विघ्नेश्वराय	ॐ श्री विघ्नेश्वराय नमः।		Shri Vighneshwaraya	Om Shri Vighneshwaraya Namah।

== See also ==
- Ganesh Chaturthi
